Tollius curtulus is a species of broad-headed bug in the family Alydidae. It is found in Central America and North America.

References

Articles created by Qbugbot
Insects described in 1859
Alydinae